Asra College of Engineering and Technology (ACET), Sangrur is a part of Asra Group of Institutions run by Ram Asra Goyal Education & Research Society. The college is affiliated to Punjab Technical University, Jalandhar and approved by AICTE, New Delhi. The prime aim of the college is committed to impart the best of the curriculum for Engineering, Science and Technology, delivered through the best academic practices and innovative tools in pedagogy. Their mission is to provide the youth of the Malwa Region ultra-modern educational opportunities that create skill and knowledge which will allow the students to adjust themselves with social and technological Facilities at Asra College of Engineering and Technology

Facilities
Library
Laboratories
Classrooms
Transportation
Internet
Canteen
Hostels
Workshop
Medical Center
Bank/ATM Service
Sports

Departments
Department of Computer Science
Department of Mechanical Engineering
Department of Electronics and Communication Engineering
Department of Civil Engineering

2009 establishments in Punjab, India